William H. Seippel is an executive, turnaround specialist, and company founder. He is also an active donor, with primary support efforts going to Make a Wish Foundation and George Mason University, where he received the Distinguished Alumni Award in 2009.

Seippel currently serves as founder, chief executive officer and chairman of WorthPoint Corporation, the leading global resource for researching, valuing, and buying/selling antiques, art and vintage collectibles. Worthpoint is Seippel's first startup, which he describes as a company "... on its way to becoming the Bloomberg of the world's antiques and collectibles industry". WorthPoint ranked on the Inc. list of companies in 2013. WorthPoint.com services include a price guide for researching and valuing antiques, art, and collectibles; a resource gallery  for identifying makers’ marks; and a digital library of books from leading publishers on a wide range of collecting topics. WorthPoint’s Worthopedia price guide gives subscribers access to more than 480 million historical prices and over 1.2 billion photographs, with data dating as far back as 2006 aggregated from online marketplaces including eBay and from several leading auction houses.

During 25 plus years of financial and operational experience, Seippel successfully negotiated more than 20 acquisitions. He played a leading role in structuring complex transactions that raised $5 billion in capital, two of which received the prestigious Institutional Investor Deal of the Year award. One of these transactions included the launching of the first Euro denominated bond for the first European fiber loop, Hermes Europe Railtel. Seippel also listed three companies on the NASDAQ; two of them involved initial public offerings.

Prior to founding WorthPoint, Seippel served as chief financial officer of MIVA; vice president and chief financial officer for AirGate PCS; chief financial officer and chief operating officer for Digital Commerce Corporation; chief financial officer for Global Telesystems Groups; and chief financial officer for Landmark Graphics Corporation. He also served as a consultant to various boards of directors on mergers and acquisitions, as well as on strategic business and financial planning.

Seippel also is known for the 2004 IRS tax shelter controversy and subsequent case Seippel v. Jenkens & Gilchrist against the Sidley Austin Brown & Wood law firm. In this action, Seippel was successful in demonstrating that the defendants misrepresented the nature of the tax product they sold to him (the Cobra tax strategy in 1999). Subsequently, Seippel prepared to file suit against the IRS for attempting to wrongfully impose excessive interest and penalties against him, but the IRS withdrew its action and the suit was never filed.

Seippel has a strong commitment to education and has received degrees from two highly respected institutions. He has a bachelor's degree in science from George Mason University and a master's degree in business administration from American University. He has received various awards for his contributions, including the Distinguished Alumni Award from George Mason University and the Business School's Alumni of the Year award in 2009. He currently serves as chairman of the advisory board for the School of Management at George Mason University.

In conclusion, William H. Seippel is a visionary entrepreneur, experienced executive, and dedicated philanthropist. With his extensive experience in finance and operations, his commitment to education, and his successful track record, he is a respected leader in the business community.

References

Living people
American chief executives of financial services companies
American chief operating officers
Kogod School of Business alumni
George Mason University alumni
American chief financial officers
Year of birth missing (living people)